The Mayor of Bastia is the head of Bastia City Council. The mayor is an elected politician who, along with the 49 members of Bastia City Council, is responsible for the strategic government of the city of Bastia, Corsica.

The current Mayor is Pierre Savelli, elected on 7 January 2016.

Mayors of Bastia

See also 

 Bastia
 Municipal council
 Municipal elections in France
 Mayor

References

External links 

 List of mayors of Bastia on the site of FranceGenWeb
 Website of Bastia Town Hall

Bastia
Mayors